Hotel Beau Rivage Mekong is a hotel in Vientiane, Laos,  located on Fa Ngum Road, in Ban Seetarn Neua. It overlooks the Mekong River and is recognisable by its pink facade. The rooms are mostly decorated in shades of blue. The hotel is surrounded by the Pakpak Technical School, the Lao Development Bank and the Fujwara Japanese Restaurant.

References

Hotels in Vientiane